Muhd Zameer bin Zainun (born 29 August 1990) is a Malaysian footballer who currently plays as a midfielder for Kuala Lumpur FA in the Malaysian Super League.

Previously, he played for PKNS FC. He was also the member of Selangor President Cup's team.

Zameer made his Malaysian League debut in 2009 Malaysian Charity Shield against Kedah FA. He also contribute one of Selangor goal in 4-1 trashing of the Malaysian champions.

References

1990 births
Living people
Malaysian footballers
People from Selangor
Malaysian people of Malay descent
Association football utility players
Selangor FA players
DRB-Hicom F.C. players
Kuala Lumpur City F.C. players
PKNS F.C. players
Johor Darul Ta'zim II F.C. players